The LG LX140, or LG Aloha, is a clamshell type phone from LG Electronics. It was released exclusively to U.S. carrier Virgin Mobile. Features include:
LCD 128x128 pixels, 65k-color STN Display, SMS messaging, mobile web, scheduler, world clock and speakerphone.

LX140